Agyneta dentifera is a species of sheet weaver found in Angola and Nigeria. It was described by Locket in 1968.

References

dentifera
Spiders of Africa
Fauna of Angola
Fauna of Nigeria
Spiders described in 1968